Bà Rá mountain or White Virgin Mountain (núi Bà Rá) is a mountain in the Bình Phước Province of Vietnam. It is a twin with Núi Bà Đen, Black Virgin Mountain

References

Mountains of Vietnam